The Orchard Walls is a play by the British writer R.F. Delderfield. A drama, it examines the relationship between the daughter of wealthy parents and the car mechanic with whom she falls in love and attempts to elope with. It was first staged at  Aldershot in October 1953 and later moved to the St Martin's Theatre in London.

Original cast
Philip O'Hea - Cyril Raymond
Michael Pritchard - John Charlesworth
Nicholas Stubbs - Colin Douglas
Geoffrey Pritchard - Edward Evans
Rachel Ames - Maureen O'Reilly
Beatrice Maynard - Gillian Lind
Christine Muir - Valerie White
Mrs. Grant - Helen Horsey
Shirley Grant - Dorothy Gordon

Adaptations
In 1955, the play was adapted for radio and broadcast on the BBC Home Service, with Dorothy Gordon and John Charlesworth repeating their stage roles.

In 1956, the play was adapted into a film Now and Forever directed by Mario Zampi, and starring Janette Scott and Vernon Gray.

References

Bibliography
 Harper, Sue & Porter, Vincent. British Cinema of the 1950s: The Decline of Deference. Oxford University Press, 2007.
 Watson, George. The New Cambridge bibliography of English literature, Volume 5. Cambridge University Press, 1972.

1953 plays
British plays adapted into films
West End plays